The Plateforme Militante is a political party in Mauritius founded in 2018. The party is led by Steven Obeegadoo.

Coalition between MSM-ML-Plateforme Militante
The party formed a coalition with Militant Socialist Movement and the Muvman Liberater for the 2019 general elections of Mauritius.

References

 Political parties in Mauritius
 Political parties established in 2018